The Malaysia National Aviation Policy is a comprehensive policy defining all the key aspects of aviation in Malaysia, such as its direction, objectives and long-term strategies, for the purpose of stakeholder transparency.

History 

The National Aviation Policy was first proposed and announced on 17 October 2011. The Transport Ministry was tasked with drafting the policy framework, following an announcement by Prime Minister Datuk Seri Najib Razak.

In 2010, before the announcement, the former CEO of MAS, Tengku Datuk Azmil Zahruddin, and AirAsia X CEO Azran Osman Rani, had called for a clear aviation policy for Malaysia, to ensure free and fair competition on a level playing field.

However, the then transport minister Datuk Seri Ong Tee Keat had shot down their call, saying that existing guidelines were sufficient.

Details

Purpose
 To ensure the survival of the country's aviation players
 Define key aspects of aviation, direction, objectives and long-term strategies for all Malaysian Aviation stakeholder
 Fair route allocation

Key Actor 
 Minister of Transport
 Department of Civil Aviation 
 MAS 
 AirAsia
 Malindo Air 
 MAHB

References

Public policy in Malaysia
Ministry of Transport (Malaysia)
Aviation in Malaysia
2011 establishments in Malaysia